Marshal Shaposhnikov is a  of the Russian Navy commissioned in 1985. The vessel serves in the Russian Pacific Fleet. Her namesake is Marshal Boris Shaposhnikov.

Operational history
On 6 April 2003, Marshal Shaposhnikov left port, along with Admiral Panteleyev and the navy tanker Vladimir Kolechitskiy, to start a deployment to the Indian Ocean, where exercises with the Indian Navy were planned for May 2003. A number of Black Sea Fleet ships, plus, possibly, cruise missile submarines, joined the deployment.

On 6 May 2010, Russian Naval Infantry deployed from Marshal Shaposhnikov rescued the hijacked tanker . The entire crew escaped unharmed. Moscow University had been hijacked by Somali pirates on 5 May 2010 off Socotra Island. The commandos from Marshal Shaposhnikov detained 10 pirates and killed one during the release of the tanker.

In November 2014, Marshal Shaposhnikov was part of a four-ship deployment to international waters off Australia. The deployment was believed to be linked to the 2014 G-20 Brisbane summit and growing tensions between the two nations.

In 2017 the ship received upgrades to its weapon systems and sensors. The upgrade included 16x 3S14 VLS cells for either Kalibr, Oniks or Zircon cruise missiles and two 3S24 quadruple launchers for 3M24 anti-ship missiles.

On 16 February 2018, the ship caught fire at Vladivostok. All 106 crew were evacuated.

On 10 July 2020 the Marshal Shaposhnikov, being reclassified as a frigate, started sea trials after receiving upgrades.

In April 2021, she launched Kalibr missiles against a land and a naval target, located respectively at a distance of over 1,000 km and 100 km.

She underwent another modernization in fall 2021.

On the 21 to 23 June 2022, Marshal Shaposhnikov and the corvette Gremyashchiy visited the port of Manila in the Philippines. On 25 June, the ships along with tanker Pechenga arrived to Cam Rahn, Vietnam. On 5 September, the destroyer took part in Vostok-2022 exercise in the Sea of Japan. On 15 September, she took part in the second Russo-Chinese joint naval patrol, along with corvettes Sovershenny, Gromky, Aldar Tsydenzhapov and tanker Pechenga.

From the 21 to 27 December 2022, Marshal Shaposhnikov along with Pacific Fleet flagship Russian cruiser Varyag (1983), the Project 20380 corvettes Russian corvette Hero of the Russian Federation Aldar Tsydenzhapov and Russian corvette Sovershennyy carried out joint drills in the East China Sea with the Chinese Navy.

References

External links 

1983 ships
Udaloy-class destroyers
Cold War destroyers of the Soviet Union
Ships built at Yantar Shipyard
Maritime incidents in 2018